Mordellistena acuticollis is a species of beetle in the genus Mordellistena of the family Mordellidae. It was discovered in 1895.

References

acuticollis
Beetles described in 1895